The Propaganda-Gewehrgranate was a non-lethal rifle grenade designed to deliver propaganda leaflets that was developed by Germany and used by the Wehrmacht during World War II.

Design 
The Propaganda-Gewehrgranate was launched from a Gewehrgranatengerät or Schiessbecher ("shooting cup") on a standard service rifle by a blank cartridge and consisted of a cylindrical steel body with a rifled driving band, and a removable nose cap. The coiled leaflets were held loosely by two steel packing covers inside the projectile's case. On firing, the flash from the blank cartridge ignites a time fuze and after approximately 9 seconds the ejecting charge at the base of the grenade explodes, driving the ejecting platform and packing covers forward unseating the nose cap and scattering the leaflets.

Photo Gallery

References

Grenades of Germany
Rifle grenades
World War II weapons of Germany